Owen McGlynn (1878 – October 15, 1918) was an architect who practiced in Wilkes-Barre, Pennsylvania at the end of the nineteenth century and at the beginning of the twentieth. He designed in a variety of styles, including the classical and Gothic revival. His built works included numerous banks, schools and churches.

Biography

McGlynn was born in Stockton, Pennsylvania on March 28, 1878, the son of Daniel and Bridget McGlynn. The father immigrated to the United States in 1866 and worked as a coal miner, and the son was educated at St. Mary's R.C. School in Wilkes-Barre, Pennsylvania. In the 1900 census at Wilkes-Barre, McGlynn gave his age as 23 and his occupation as architect.

Around 1900, McGlynn formed a partnership with an older, more established architect, Benjamin Davey, Jr. That year, they completed the new St. Aloysius R.C. Church in Lee Park, near Wilkes-Barre, to which they each donated a stained glass window. McGlynn married Elizabeth MacDermott on October 17, 1900. After Davey died in December 1901, McGlynn took over full ownership of the practice.

McGlynn died on October 15, 1918 of pneumonia brought as a result of the Spanish flu.

Architectural works

Among the completed works of Owen McGlynn are the following:

 Rubinsky Building, Market Street Luzerne, Pennsylvania (1897, while employed by Rudrauff & Davey).
 C.M. Schwab School, Weatherly, Pennsylvania, begun September 1901 and dedicated on September 19, 1903. 
 St. Ann's Monastery, Scranton, Pennsylvania (dedicated in March, 1904). 
 27 South Main Street Office Building, Wilkes-Barre, Pennsylvania (completed in 1904).
 Nanticoke High School, Nanticoke, Pennsylvania (completed in 1904).
 School and Convent, St. Mary's Church, Washington St., Wilkes-Barre, Pennsylvania (1905).
 Convent, St. Vincent's Church, Plymouth, Pennsylvania (completed in 1905).
 Sacred Heart of Jesus Church, Wilkes-Barre, Pennsylvania, (cornerstone laid October 14, 1906).
 St. Mary's School, conversion of church to school, Plymouth, Pennsylvania (1907).
 First National Bank, Nanticoke, Pennsylvania (1907).
 First National Bank, Lansford, Pennsylvania (1907).
 First National Bank, Tamaqua, Pennsylvania (1907).
 Addition to Mercy Hospital, Wilkes-Barre, Pennsylvania (1907).
 Sts. Cyril and Methodius Church and Residence, Edwardsville, Pennsylvania (1907). 
 Town Hall, Coaldale, Pennsylvania (1907).
 St. Mary's Byzantine Catholic Church, Freeland, Pennsylvania (1907).
 Washington Avenue School, Plymouth, Pennsylvania (1908).
 Courtright Avenue School (about 1908).
 Church of the Immaculate Conception, Jim Thorpe, Pennsylvania (dedicated October 4, 1908).
 Church of the Sacred Heart of Jesus and Mary, Scranton, Pennsylvania.
 St. Mary's Greek Catholic Church, McAdoo, Pennsylvania.
 James M. Coughlin High School, Wilkes-Barre, Pennsylvania (dedicated February 1912).
 Citizens Bank, Freeland, Pennsylvania (completed July 1913).

Gallery

See also
Architecture of Plymouth, Pennsylvania

References

Architects from Pennsylvania
1878 births
1918 deaths
20th-century American architects
Deaths from pneumonia in Pennsylvania
Deaths from the Spanish flu pandemic in the United States
Deaths from the Spanish flu pandemic in Pennsylvania